Wolfram Adalbert Scheffler (born 1956 in Karl-Marx-Stadt) is a German painter and artist. He won the Hans-Theo-Richter-Preis of the Sächsische Akademie der Künste in 2007.

References

1956 births
Living people
20th-century German painters
20th-century German male artists
German male painters
21st-century German painters
21st-century German male artists
People from Chemnitz